William Neil McDonnell (July 15, 1876 – May 11, 1941) was an American sport shooter who competed in the 1912 Summer Olympics.

In 1912 he won the silver medal as member of the American team in the team running deer, single shots event and the bronze medal in the team 25 metre small-bore rifle competition. In the 1912 Summer Olympics he also participated in the following events:

 25 metre small-bore rifle - 14th place
 50 metre rifle, prone - 18th place
 300 metre military rifle, three positions - 31st place
 600 metre free rifle - 32nd place

References

External links
profile (name misspelt)

1876 births
1941 deaths
American male sport shooters
ISSF rifle shooters
Running target shooters
Shooters at the 1912 Summer Olympics
Olympic silver medalists for the United States in shooting
Olympic bronze medalists for the United States in shooting
Medalists at the 1912 Summer Olympics